Les Jones (born 9 November 1940 in Wrexham, Wales) is a footballer who played as an inside forward in the Football League for Tranmere Rovers.

References

1940 births
Living people
Footballers from Wrexham
Association football inside forwards
Welsh footballers
Bolton Wanderers F.C. players
Tranmere Rovers F.C. players
Chester City F.C. players
Runcorn F.C. Halton players
English Football League players